Zainab Bint ‘Umar Bin Kindi (died 699 Hijri / c. 1300 CE) was a female muhaddith in 13th century Damascus and Baalbek. She is most notable for being the most prominent "shaykha" or teacher of the Muslim scholar and historian Al-Dhahabi.

Biography

Scholarship 
She received permissions (ijazah) to narrate from Al-Muayid al-Tusi, Abu Ruh al-Harawi, Zainab al-Sha’riyah, Al-Qasim Ibn-al-Saaffar, Abdul-Baqa al-Uqbari, ‘Abdul-‘Adhim Bin ‘Abdal-Latif al-Sharabi and Ahmed Bin Zafar Bin Hubairah.
She studied Kitab al-Tawhid of Ibn Khuzaymah and had  going back to him.

Personal life
Her husband was Nasir-al-Din Ibn Qarqin, the commissar of the Baalbek citadel. Zainab Bint ‘Umar Bin Kindi died on the 29th of Jumada Al-Aakhirah at the Baalbek citadel at the age of ninety.

Notable students
She was a teacher of al-Dhahabi (1274–1348), the Islamic historian and traditionalist, when he was in Baalbek. Dhahabi learned the beginning of the Sahih Al-Bukhari from her as well as the beginning of the book of Al-Nikaah.

She was also a teacher of Muhammad ibn Qawalij, a tutor of Ibn Hajar al-Asqalani.

Legacy 
Al-Dhahabi writes about her that she was "a righteous woman, generous, who possessed piety and (gave) charity. She built a hospice for the poor and she bequeathed religious endowments." Dhahabi also says that she was "without parallel in the time (that she lived in)." He notes that his father, his maternal uncle, and many other people in Baalbek received the tradition from her ("Abul-Hussain Al-Yunini and his children and relatives, Ibn Abil-Fath and his two sons, Al-Mizzi and his elder son, Al-Birzali, Ibn-al-Nabulusi, Abu Bakr al-Rahbi, Ibn-al-Muhandis, Ahmed Ibn-al-Duraybi").

References 

1213 births
1300 deaths
13th-century Arabs
Year of death uncertain
13th-century deaths
People from Damascus
Hadith scholars
13th-century Muslim scholars of Islam
Women scholars of the medieval Islamic world
Kinda